Ilm-Kreis II is an electoral constituency (German: Wahlkreis) represented in the Landtag of Thuringia. It elects one member via first-past-the-post voting. Under the current constituency numbering system, it is designated as constituency 23. It covers the northern and western part of Ilm-Kreis.

Ilm-Kreis II was created for the 1994 state election. Since 2019, it has been represented by Olaf Kießling of Alternative for Germany (AfD).

Geography
As of the 2019 state election, Ilm-Kreis II covers the southern part of Ilm-Kreis, specifically the municipalities of Alkersleben, Amt Wachsenburg, Arnstadt, Bösleben-Wüllersleben, Dornheim, Elleben, Elxleben, Geratal (excluding Geraberg), Osthausen-Wülfershausen, Plaue (excluding Neusiß), Rockhausen, Stadtilm, and Witzleben. It also includes the village of Gehlberg from Suhl.

Members
The constituency was held by the Christian Democratic Union (CDU) from its creation in 1994 until 2019, during which time it was represented by Winfried Neumann (1994–1999), Klaus von der Krone (1999–2014), and Jörg Thamm (2014–2019). It was won by Alternative for Germany in 2019, and is represented by Olaf Kießling.

Election results

2019 election

2014 election

2009 election

2004 election

1999 election

1994 election

References

Electoral districts in Thuringia
1994 establishments in Germany
Ilm-Kreis
Constituencies established in 1994